Pachliopta strandi is a species of butterfly from the family Papilionidae that is found in the Philippines.

Subspecies
Pachliopta strandi strandi (Philippines: Mindoro)
Pachliopta strandi marinduquensis (Page & Treadaway, 1997) (Philippines: Marinduque)
Pachliopta strandi nuydaorum (Page & Treadaway, 1997) (Philippines: Luzon)
Pachliopta strandi splendida (Schröder & Treadaway, 1984) (Philippines: Sibuyan)
Pachliopta strandi elizabethi (Page & Treadaway, 1997) (Philippines: Panay, Guiamaras)

References

Page M. G.P & Treadaway,C. G.  2003 Schmetterlinge der Erde, Butterflies of the world Part XVII (17), Papilionidae IX Papilionidae of the Philippine Islands. Edited by Erich Bauer and  Thomas Frankenbach  Keltern : Goecke & Evers ; Canterbury : Hillside Books. 

Pachliopta
Butterflies described in 1895